County routes in Westchester County, New York, are maintained by the Westchester County highway department. They provide additional interconnections between state highways within the county. Some portions of state highways in Lower Westchester County are county-maintained and thus also carry county route designations. Additionally, actions relating to planning and zoning along some former county roads are still subject to review by the Westchester County Planning Board, and these roads still carry their county route numbers for inventory purposes. The vast majority (if not all) of county routes in Westchester County are unsigned.

Routes 1–100

Routes 101–200

Routes 201 and up

See also

County routes in New York
List of former state routes in New York (101–200)

Notes

References

External links
Westchester County DPW – County Road Information